The Needles are a series of massive granite rock formations rising up from the North Fork of the Kern River near its junction with the Little Kern River.

Background
On July 28, 2011, the Needles lookout, constructed in 1937-1938 by the Civilian Conservation Corps, was destroyed in a structure fire.

Gallery

References

Climbing areas of California
Mountains of Tulare County, California
Mountains of Northern California